The 2021–22 Dallas Mavericks season was the 42nd season of the franchise in the National Basketball Association (NBA). For the first time since 2007–08, Rick Carlisle would not be the head coach of the Mavericks, as he announced his departure from the team on June 17, 2021. It was the first season since 2004–05 without long-time general manager Donnie Nelson, as he announced his departure from the team on June 17, 2021, a day prior to Rick Carlisle's mutual parting with the Mavs. Carlisle and Nelson were part of the Mavs' 2010–11 championship squad, with Nelson being part of the 2005–06 team that made the Finals that year. On June 28, 2021, the Mavericks hired former player and championship member Jason Kidd as their new head coach.

In the playoffs, the Mavericks defeated the Utah Jazz in six games in the first round winning their first playoff series since their 2011 championship run. The Mavericks then upset the top-seeded Phoenix Suns in seven games in the Conference Semifinals, but lost to the eventual champion Golden State Warriors in five games in the Conference Finals.

Draft

The Mavericks had no picks in this years draft after trading their two choices away.

Roster

Standings

Division

Conference

Schedule

Preseason
The preseason schedule was announced on September 10, 2021.

|-style="background:#cfc;"
| 1
| October 6
| Utah
| 
| Luka Dončić (19)
| Willie Cauley-Stein (9)
| Jalen Brunson (8)
| American Airlines Center15,841
| 1–0
|-style="background:#cfc;"
| 2
| October 8
| LA Clippers
| 
| Eugene Omoruyi (19)
| Dončić, Green (8)
| Luka Dončić (9)
| American Airlines Center17,853
| 2–0
|-style="background:#cfc;"
| 3
| October 13
| @ Charlotte
|  
| Tim Hardaway Jr. (19)
| Kristaps Porziņģis (9)
| Luka Dončić (8)
| Spectrum Center8,583
| 3–0
|-style="background:#cfc;"
| 4
| October 15
| @ Milwaukee
| 
| Jalen Brunson (17)
| Dorian Finney-Smith (7)
| Jalen Brunson (5)
| Fiserv Forum12,946
| 4–0

Regular season
The national TV games in the first week and the Christmas games were announced on August 17, 2021. The whole schedule was revealed on August 20, 2021.

|-style="background:#fcc;"
| 1
| October 21
| @ Atlanta
| 
| Luka Dončić (18)
| Luka Dončić (11)
| Luka Dončić (7)
| State Farm Arena17,162
| 0–1
|-style="background:#cfc;"
| 2
| October 23
| @ Toronto
| 
| Luka Dončić (27)
| Kristaps Porziņģis (10)
| Luka Dončić (12)
| Scotiabank Arena19,800
| 1–1
|-style="background:#cfc;"
| 3
| October 26
| Houston
| 
| Luka Dončić (26)
| Luka Dončić (14)
| Jalen Brunson (11)
| American Airlines Center19,337
| 2–1
|-style="background:#cfc;"
| 4
| October 28
| San Antonio
| 
| Luka Dončić (25)
| Maxi Kleber (10)
| Brunson, Dončić (5)
| American Airlines Center19,228
| 3–1
|-style="background:#fcc;"
| 5
| October 29
| @ Denver
| 
| Luka Dončić (16)
| Josh Green (7)
| Luka Dončić (4)
| Ball Arena18,315
| 3–2
|-style="background:#cfc;"
| 6
| October 31
| Sacramento
| 
| Luka Dončić (23)
| Dončić, Powell (8)
| Luka Dončić (10)
| American Airlines Center19,231
| 4–2

|-style="background:#fcc;"
| 7
| November 2
| Miami
| 
| Luka Dončić (33)
| Dwight Powell (8)
| Luka Dončić (5)
| American Airlines Center19,255
| 4–3
|-style="background:#cfc;"
| 8
| November 3
| @ San Antonio
| 
| Jalen Brunson (31)
| Luka Dončić (12)
| Luka Dončić (7)
| AT&T Center16,536
| 5–3
|-style="background:#cfc;"
| 9
| November 6
| Boston
| 
| Luka Dončić (33)
| Luka Dončić (9)
| Brunson, Dončić (5)
| American Airlines Center20,052
| 6–3
|-style="background:#cfc;"
| 10
| November 8
| New Orleans
| 
| Luka Dončić (25)
| Porziņģis, Powell (8)
| Jalen Brunson (6)
| American Airlines Center19,231
| 7–3
|-style="background:#fcc;"
| 11
| November 10
| @ Chicago
| 
| Kristaps Porziņģis (22)
| Kristaps Porziņģis (12)
| Luka Dončić (10)
| United Center20,910
| 7–4
|-style="background:#cfc;"
| 12
| November 12
| @ San Antonio
| 
| Luka Dončić (32)
| Luka Dončić (12)
| Luka Dončić (15)
| AT&T Center13,425
| 8–4
|-style="background:#cfc;"
| 13
| November 15
| Denver
| 
| Kristaps Porziņģis (29)
| Kristaps Porziņģis (11)
| Luka Dončić (11)
| American Airlines Center19,797
| 9–4
|-style="background:#fcc;"
| 14
| November 17
| @ Phoenix
| 
| Tim Hardaway Jr. (22)
| Dwight Powell (13)
| Jalen Brunson (9)
| Footprint Center14,838
| 9–5
|-style="background:#fcc;"
| 15
| November 19
| @ Phoenix
| 
| Kristaps Porziņģis (23)
| Kristaps Porziņģis (12) 
| Jalen Brunson (10)
| Footprint Center17,071
| 9–6
|-style="background:#fcc;"
| 16
| November 21
| @ LA Clippers
| 
| Kristaps Porziņģis (25)
| Kristaps Porziņģis (8) 
| Jalen Brunson (8)
| Staples Center17,149
| 9–7
|-style="background:#cfc;"
| 17
| November 23
| @ LA Clippers
| 
| Kristaps Porziņģis (30)
| Dončić, Kleber (9)
| Luka Dončić (9)
| Staples Center17,067
| 10–7
|-style="background:#fcc;"
| 18
| November 27
| Washington
| 
| Luka Dončić (33)
| Kristaps Porziņģis (7)
| Luka Dončić (10)
| American Airlines Center20,223
| 10–8
|-style="background:#fcc;"
| 19
| November 29
| Cleveland
| 
| Luka Dončić (25)
| Luka Dončić (10)
| Luka Dončić (10)
| American Airlines Center19,229
| 10–9

|-style="background:#cfc;"
| 20
| December 1
| @ New Orleans
| 
| Luka Dončić (28)
| Kristaps Porziņģis (10)
| Luka Dončić (14)
| Smoothie King Center15,558
| 11–9
|-style="background:#fcc;"
| 21
| December 3
| New Orleans
| 
| Luka Dončić (21)
| Luka Dončić (10)
| Luka Dončić (7)
| American Airlines Center19,218
| 11–10
|-style="background:#fcc;"
| 22
| December 4
| Memphis
| 
| Tim Hardaway Jr. (29)
| Maxi Kleber (9)
| Jalen Brunson (8)
| American Airlines Center19,396
| 11–11
|-style="background:#fcc;"
| 23
| December 7
| Brooklyn
| 
| Luka Dončić (28)
| Kristaps Porziņģis (12)
| Luka Dončić (9)
| American Airlines Center19,559
| 11–12
|-style="background:#cfc;"
| 24
| December 8
| @ Memphis
| 
| Luka Dončić (26)
| Luka Dončić (8)
| Brunson, Dončić (7)
| FedExForum14,025
| 12–12
|-style="background:#fcc;"
| 25
| December 10
| @ Indiana
| 
| Luka Dončić (27)
| Luka Dončić (9)
| Luka Dončić (9)
| Bankers Life Fieldhouse12,618
| 12–13
|-style="background:#cfc;"
| 26
| December 12
| @ Oklahoma City
| 
| Jalen Brunson (18)
| Jalen Brunson (9)
| Burke, Finney-Smith (9)
| Paycom Center15,747
| 13–13
|-style="background:#cfc;"
| 27
| December 13
| Charlotte
| 
| Kristaps Porziņģis (24)
| Kristaps Porziņģis (13)
| Jalen Brunson (8)
| American Airlines Center19,213
| 14–13
|-style="background:#fcc;"
| 28
| December 15
| LA Lakers
| 
| Jalen Brunson (25)
| Kristaps Porziņģis (12)
| Jalen Brunson (9)
| American Airlines Center20,270
| 14–14
|-style="background:#fcc;"
| 29
| December 19
| @ Minnesota
| 
| Tim Hardaway Jr. (28)
| Maxi Kleber (14)
| Jalen Brunson (11)
| Target Center16,127
| 14–15
|-style="background:#cfc;"
| 30
| December 21
| Minnesota
| 
| Jalen Brunson (28)
| Sterling Brown (11)
| Trey Burke (7)
| American Airlines Center20,056
| 15–15
|-style="background:#fcc;"
| 31
| December 23
| Milwaukee
| 
| Jalen Brunson (19) 
| Sterling Brown (13)
| Jalen Brunson (8) 
| American Airlines Center19,654
| 15–16
|-style="background:#fcc;"
| 32
| December 25
| @ Utah
| 
| Brunson, Porziņģis (27)
| Kristaps Porziņģis (9)
| Jalen Brunson (6)
| Vivint Arena18,306
| 15–17
|-style="background:#cfc;"
| 33
| December 27
| @ Portland
| 
| Kristaps Porziņģis (34)
| Finney-Smith, Porziņģis (9) 
| Josh Green (10)
| Moda Center18,430
| 16–17
|-style="background:#fcc;"
| 34
| December 29
| @ Sacramento
| 
| Jalen Brunson (25)
| Kristaps Porziņģis (7)
| Jalen Brunson (6)
| Golden 1 Center16,071
| 16–18
|-style="background:#cfc;"
| 35
| December 31
| @ Sacramento
| 
| Kristaps Porziņģis (24)
| Kristaps Porziņģis (9)
| Jalen Brunson (8)
| Golden 1 Center15,833
| 17–18

|-style="background:#cfc;"
| 36
| January 2
| @ Oklahoma City
| 
| Chriss, Hardaway Jr. (15)
| Luka Dončić (9)
| Luka Dončić (10)
| Paycom Center14,751
| 18–18
|-style="background:#cfc;"
| 37
| January 3
| Denver
| 
| Luka Dončić (21)
| Luka Dončić (8)
| Luka Dončić (15)
| American Airlines Center19,767
| 19–18
|-style="background:#cfc;"
| 38
| January 5
| Golden State
|  
| Luka Dončić (26) 
| Maxi Kleber (10) 
| Luka Dončić (8) 
| American Airlines Center20,441
| 20–18
|-style="background:#cfc;"
| 39
| January 7
| @ Houston
| 
| Tim Hardaway Jr. (19)
| Maxi Kleber (11)
| Jalen Brunson (10)
| Toyota Center15,238
| 21–18
|-style="background:#cfc;"
| 40
| January 9
| Chicago
| 
| Luka Dončić (22)
| Luka Dončić (14)
| Luka Dončić (14)
| American Airlines Center20,041
| 22–18
|-style="background:#fcc;"
| 41
| January 12
| @ New York
| 
| Luka Dončić (21)
| Luka Dončić (11)
| Jalen Brunson (6)
| Madison Square Garden18,215
| 22–19
|-style="background:#cfc;"
| 42
| January 14
| @ Memphis
| 
| Luka Dončić (27)
| Luka Dončić (12)
| Luka Dončić (10)
| FedExForum16,712
| 23–19
|-style="background:#cfc;"
| 43
| January 15
| Orlando
| 
| Luka Dončić (23)
| Luka Dončić (9)
| three players (3)
| American Airlines Center19,816
| 24–19
|-style="background:#cfc;"
| 44
| January 17
| Oklahoma City
| 
| Luka Dončić (20) 
| Luka Dončić (11) 
| Luka Dončić (12) 
| American Airlines Center19,266
| 25–19
|-style="background:#cfc;"
| 45
| January 19
| Toronto
| 
| Luka Dončić (41)
| Luka Dončić (14)
| Luka Dončić (7)
| American Airlines Center19,218
| 26–19
|-style="background:#fcc;"
| 46
| January 20
| Phoenix
| 
| Luka Dončić (28)
| Kristaps Porziņģis (11)
| Luka Dončić (8)
| American Airlines Center19,584
| 26–20
|-style="background:#cfc;"
| 47
| January 23
| Memphis
| 
| Luka Dončić (37)
| Luka Dončić (11)
| Luka Dončić (9)
| American Airlines Center19,701
| 27–20
|-style="background:#fcc;"
| 48
| January 25
| @ Golden State
| 
| Luka Dončić (25)
| Luka Dončić (8)
| Jalen Brunson (5)
| Chase Center18,064
| 27–21
|-style="background:#cfc;"
| 49
| January 26
| @ Portland
| 
| Kristaps Porziņģis (22)
| Luka Dončić (10)
| Luka Dončić (15)
| Moda Center16,334
| 28–21
|-style="background:#cfc;"
| 50
| January 29
| Indiana
| 
| Luka Dončić (30)
| Maxi Kleber (14)
| Luka Dončić (12)
| American Airlines Center19,831
| 29–21
|-style="background:#fcc;"
| 51
| January 30
| @ Orlando
| 
| Luka Dončić (34)
| Luka Dončić (12)
| Luka Dončić (11)
| Amway Center13,376
| 29–22

|-style="background:#fcc;"
| 52
| February 2
| Oklahoma City
|  
| Luka Dončić (40)
| Bullock, Kleber (8)
| Luka Dončić (10)
| American Airlines Center19,200
| 29–23
|-style="background:#cfc;"
| 53
| February 4
| Philadelphia
| 
| Luka Dončić (33)
| Luka Dončić (13)
| Luka Dončić (15)
| American Airlines Center19,200
| 30–23
|-style="background:#cfc;"
| 54
| February 6
| Atlanta
| 
| Brunson, Bullock (22)
| Luka Dončić (10)
| Luka Dončić (11)
| American Airlines Center19,887
| 31–23
|-style="background:#cfc;"
| 55
| February 8
| Detroit
| 
| Luka Dončić (33)
| Dončić, Finney-Smith, Kleber, Powell (7) 
| Luka Dončić (11)
| American Airlines Center19,200
| 32–23
|-style="background:#cfc;"
| 56
| February 10
| LA Clippers
| 
| Luka Dončić (51)
| Dončić, Kleber (9)
| Luka Dončić (6)
| American Airlines Center19,532
| 33–23
|-style="background:#fcc;"
| 57
| February 12
| LA Clippers
| 
| Luka Dončić (45)
| Luka Dončić (15)
| Luka Dončić (8)
| American Airlines Center20,028
| 33–24
|-style="background:#cfc;"
| 58
| February 15
| @ Miami
|  
| Luka Dončić (21)
| Luka Dončić (10)
| Brunson, Dončić (6)
| FTX Arena19,600
| 34–24
|-style="background:#cfc;"
| 59
| February 17
| @ New Orleans
| 
| Luka Dončić (49)
| Luka Dončić (15)
| Luka Dončić (8)
| Smoothie King Center15,906
| 35–24
|-style="background:#fcc;"
| 60
| February 25
| @ Utah
| 
| Luka Dončić (23) 
| Dončić, Powell (7) 
| Luka Dončić (11) 
| Vivint Arena18,306
| 35–25
|-style="background:#cfc;"
| 61
| February 27
| @ Golden State
| 
| Luka Dončić (34)  
| Luka Dončić (11)  
| Brunson, Dinwiddie (5)
| Chase Center18,064
| 36–25

|-style="background:#cfc;"
| 62
| March 1
| @ LA Lakers
| 
| Luka Dončić (25)  
| Dorian Finney-Smith (9)
| Spencer Dinwiddie (9)
| Staples Center17,857
| 37–25
|-style="background:#cfc;"
| 63
| March 3
| Golden State
| 
| Luka Dončić (41)
| Luka Dončić (10)
| Luka Dončić (9)
| American Airlines Center20,229
| 38–25
|-style="background:#cfc;"
| 64
| March 5
| Sacramento
| 
| Spencer Dinwiddie (36)
| Josh Green (12)
| Spencer Dinwiddie (7)
| American Airlines Center20,060
| 39–25
|-style="background:#cfc;"
| 65
| March 7
| Utah
| 
| Luka Dončić (35)
| Luka Dončić (16)
| Luka Dončić (7)
| American Airlines Center20,077
| 40–25
|-style="background:#fcc;"
| 66
| March 9
| New York
| 
| Luka Dončić (31)
| Reggie Bullock (7)
| Luka Dončić (4)
| American Airlines Center20,182
| 40–26
|-style="background:#cfc;"
| 67
| March 11
| @ Houston
| 
| Luka Dončić (30)
| Luka Dončić (14)
| Spencer Dinwiddie (7)
| Toyota Center15,060
| 41–26
|-style="background:#cfc;"
| 68
| March 13
| @ Boston
| 
| Luka Dončić (26)
| Maxi Kleber (14)
| Luka Dončić (8)
| TD Garden19,156
| 42–26
|-style="background:#cfc;"
| 69
| March 16
| @ Brooklyn
| 
| Luka Dončić (37)
| Luka Dončić (9)
| Luka Dončić (9)
| Barclays Center17,981
| 43–26
|-style="background:#fcc;"
| 70
| March 18
| @ Philadelphia
| 
| Jalen Brunson (24)
| Spencer Dinwiddie (8)
| Luka Dončić (10)
| Wells Fargo Center21,428
| 43–27
|-style="background:#fcc;"
| 71
| March 19
| @ Charlotte
| 
| Luka Dončić (37)
| Marquese Chriss (9)
| Frank Ntilikina (4)
| Spectrum Center19,279
| 43–28
|-style="background:#cfc;"
| 72
| March 21
| Minnesota
| 
| Dwight Powell (22)
| Dinwiddie, Powell (8)
| Luka Dončić (10)
| American Airlines Center20,077
| 44–28
|-style="background:#cfc;"
| 73
| March 23
| Houston
| 
| Jalen Brunson (28)
| Maxi Kleber (9)
| Spencer Dinwiddie (6)
| American Airlines Center20,026
| 45–28
|-style="background:#fcc;"
| 74
| March 25
| @ Minnesota
| 
| Luka Dončić (24)
| Luka Dončić (10)
| Luka Dončić (8)
| Target Center17,136
| 45–29
|-style="background:#cfc;"
| 75
| March 27
| Utah
| 
| Luka Dončić (32) 
| Brunson, Dončić (10)
| Brunson, Dončić (5)
| American Airlines Center20,177
| 46–29
|-style="background:#cfc;"
| 76
| March 29
| LA Lakers
| 
| Luka Dončić (34) 
| Luka Dončić (12) 
| Luka Dončić (12) 
| American Airlines Center20,382
| 47–29
|-style="background:#cfc;"
| 77
| March 30
| @ Cleveland
| 
| Luka Dončić (35) 
| Luka Dončić (9) 
| Luka Dončić (13) 
| Rocket Mortgage FieldHouse19,432
| 48–29

|-style="background:#fcc;"
| 78
| April 1
| @ Washington
| 
| Luka Dončić (36)
| Luka Dončić (7)
| Luka Dončić (6)
| Capital One Arena17,745
| 48–30
|-style="background:#cfc;"
| 79
| April 3
| @ Milwaukee
| 
| Luka Dončić (32)
| Dwight Powell (13)
| Luka Dončić (15)
| Fiserv Forum17,902
| 49–30
|-style="background:#cfc;"
| 80
| April 6
| @ Detroit
| 
| Luka Dončić (26)
| Luka Dončić (8)
| Luka Dončić (14)
| Little Caesars Arena18,422
| 50–30
|-style="background:#cfc;"
| 81
| April 8
| Portland
| 
| Luka Dončić (39)
| Luka Dončić (11)
| Luka Dončić (7)
| American Airlines Center20,174
| 51–30
|-style="background:#cfc;"
| 82
| April 10
| San Antonio
| 
| Luka Dončić (26)
| Luka Dončić (8)
| Luka Dončić (9)
| American Airlines Center20,270
| 52–30

Playoffs

|-style="background:#fcc;"
| 1
| April 16
| Utah
| 
| Jalen Brunson (24)
| Jalen Brunson (7)
| Spencer Dinwiddie (8)
| American Airlines Center20,013
| 0–1
|-style="background:#cfc;
| 2
| April 18
| Utah
| 
| Jalen Brunson (41)
| Jalen Brunson (8)
| Spencer Dinwiddie (6)
| American Airlines Center20,113
| 1–1
|-style="background:#cfc;
| 3
| April 21
| @ Utah
| 
| Jalen Brunson (31)
| Dorian Finney-Smith (8)
| Spencer Dinwiddie|Dinwiddie, Green (6)
| Vivint Arena18,306
| 2–1
|-style="background:#fcc;"
| 4
| April 23
| @ Utah
| 
| Luka Dončić (30)
| Luka Dončić (10)
| Luka Dončić (4)
| Vivint Arena18,306
| 2–2
|-style="background:#cfc;"
| 5
| April 25
| Utah
| 
| Luka Dončić (33)
| Luka Dončić (13)
| Luka Dončić (5)
| American Airlines Center20,577
| 3–2
|-style="background:#cfc;"
| 6
| April 28
| @ Utah
| 
| Brunson, Dončić (24)
| Dorian Finney-Smith (10)
| Luka Dončić (8)
| Vivint Arena18,306
| 4–2
|}

|-style="background:#fcc;"
| 1
| May 2
| @ Phoenix
| 
| Luka Dončić (45)
| Luka Dončić (12)
| Luka Dončić (8)
| Footprint Center17,071
| 0–1
|-style="background:#fcc;"
| 2
| May 4
| @ Phoenix
| 
| Luka Dončić (35)
| Brunson, Dončić (5)
| Luka Dončić (7)
| Footprint Center17,071
| 0–2
|-style="background:#cfc;"
| 3
| May 6
| Phoenix
| 
| Jalen Brunson (28)
| Luka Dončić (13)
| Luka Dončić (9)
| American Airlines Center20,777
| 1–2
|-style="background:#cfc;"
| 4
| May 8
| Phoenix
| 
| Luka Dončić (26)
| Dorian Finney-Smith (8)
| Luka Dončić (11)
| American Airlines Center20,610
| 2–2
|-style="background:#fcc;"
| 5
| May 10
| @ Phoenix
| 
| Luka Dončić (28)
| Luka Dončić (11)
| three players (2)
| Footprint Center17,071
| 2–3
|-style="background:#cfc;"
| 6
| May 12
| Phoenix
| 
| Luka Dončić (33)
| Luka Dončić (11)
| Luka Dončić (8)
| American Airlines Center20,777
| 3–3
|-style="background:#cfc;"
| 7
| May 15
| @ Phoenix
| 
| Luka Dončić (35)
| Luka Dončić (10)
| Dončić, Finney-Smith (4)
| Footprint Center17,071
| 4–3

|-style="background:#fcc;"
| 1
| May 18
| @ Golden State
| 
| Luka Dončić (20)
| Dončić, Finney-Smith (7)
| Brunson, Dončić (4)
| Chase Center18,064
| 0–1
|-style="background:#fcc;"
| 2
| May 20
| @ Golden State
| 
| Luka Dončić (42) 
| Dorian Finney-Smith (8)
| Luka Dončić (8)
| Chase Center18,064
| 0–2
|-style="background:#fcc;"
| 3
| May 22
| Golden State
| 
| Luka Dončić (40) 
| Luka Dončić (11)
| Reggie Bullock (4)
| American Airlines Center20,813
| 0–3
|-style="background:#cfc;"
| 4
| May 24
| Golden State
| 
| Luka Dončić (30)
| Luka Dončić (14)
|Luka Dončić (9)
| American Airlines Center20,810
| 1–3
|-style="background:#fcc;"
| 5
| May 26
| @ Golden State
| 
| Luka Dončić (28)
| Luka Dončić (9)
| Luka Dončić (6) 
| Chase Center18,064
| 1–4

Player statistics

Regular season
After all games.

|-
| ≠
| 22 || 0 || 13.9 || .375 || .360 || .800 || 2.5 || .7 || .3 || .3 || 5.3
|-
| 10
| 3 || 0 || 5.0 || .200 || .000 || — || .3 || .3 || .7 || .3 || .7
|-
| ~
| 26 || 1 || 6.5 || .540 || — || .628 || 2.3 || .0 || .1 || .3 || 3.1
|-
| 
| 49 || 3 || 12.8 || .381 || .304 || .933 || 3.0 || .7 || .3 || .1 || 3.3
|-
| 
| 79 || 61 || 31.9 || .502 || .373 || .840 || 3.9 || 4.8 || .8 || .0 || 16.3
|-
| 
| 68 || 37 || 28.0 || .401 || .360 || .833 || 3.5 || 1.2 || .6 || .2 || 8.6
|-
| 
| 42 || 0 || 10.5 || .391 || .317 || .870 || .8 || 1.4 || .3 || .0 || 5.1
|-
| ~
| 18 || 2 || 9.8 || .457 || .500 || .500 || 2.1 || .5 || .3 || .2 || 1.9
|-
| 
| 34 || 0 || 10.2 || .463 || .320 || .667 || 3.0 || .5 || .4 || .4 || 4.5
|-
| ≠
| 23 || 7 || 28.3 || .498 || .404 || .725 || 3.1 || 3.9 || .7 || .3 || 15.8
|-
| 
| 65 || 65 || style=background:#0B60AD;color:white;|35.4 || .457 || .353 || .744 || style=background:#0B60AD;color:white;|9.1 || style=background:#0B60AD;color:white;|8.7 || style=background:#0B60AD;color:white;|1.2 || .6 || style=background:#0B60AD;color:white;|28.4
|-
| 
| 80 || style=background:#0B60AD;color:white;|80 || 33.1 || .471 || .395 || .675 || 4.7 || 1.9 || 1.1 || .5 || 11.0
|-
| 
| 67 || 3 || 15.5 || .508 || .359 || .689 || 2.4 || 1.2 || .7 || .2 || 4.8
|-
| 
| 42 || 20 || 29.6 || .394 || .336 || .757 || 3.7 || 2.2 || .9 || .1 || 14.2
|-
| 10
| 3 || 0 || 6.3 || .000 || .000 || 1.000 || 1.0 || 1.7 || .3 || .0 || .7
|-
| 
| 59 || 21 || 24.6 || .398 || .325 || .708 || 5.9 || 1.2 || .5 || 1.0 || 7.0
|-
| 10
| 4 || 0 || 4.8 || .000 || .000 || .500 || 1.3 || .0 || .0 || .0 || .3
|-
| 10
| 5 || 0 || 13.0 || .400 || .235 || 1.000 || 1.6 || 1.6 || .2 || .0 || 6.4
|-
| ~
| 4 || 0 || 2.8 || .000 || .000 || — || .0 || .5 || .0 || .0 || .0
|-
| 
| 23 || 0 || 5.6 || .600 || .250 || .591 || 1.7 || .1 || .0 || .1 || 4.3
|-
| 
| 58 || 5 || 11.8 || .399 || .342 || .960 || 1.4 || 1.2 || .5 || .1 || 4.1
|-
| ~
| 4 || 0 || 4.5 || .400 || .500 || .500 || 1.8 || .5 || .0 || .0 || 1.8
|-
| 
| 19 || 0 || 7.8 || .359 || .333 || 1.000 || 1.1 || .9 || .3 || .1 || 2.5
|-
| ‡
| 34 || 34 || 29.5 || .451 || .283 || .865 || 7.7 || 2.0 || .7 || style=background:#0B60AD;color:white;|1.7 || 19.2
|-
| 
| style=background:#0B60AD;color:white;|82 || 71 || 21.9 || style=background:#0B60AD;color:white;|.671 || .351 || .783 || 4.9 || 1.2 || .5 || .5 || 8.7
|-
| 10
| 1 || 0 || 13.0 || .375 || .000 || — || .0 || 4.0 || .0 || .0 || 6.0
|-
| 
| 3 || 0 || 4.3 || .250 || .000 || 1.000 || 1.0 || .3 || .0 || .3 || 1.7
|}
‡Traded during the season
≠Acquired during the season
~Waived during the season
10Signed 10-day contract

Playoffs
After all games.

|-
| ≠
| 18 || 0 || 10.7 || .400 || .373 || .833 || 1.4 || .3 || .4 || .1 || 4.1
|-
| 
| 9 || 0 || 2.9 || .300 || .000 || .714 || .9 || .3 || .4 || .2 || 1.2
|-
| 
| 18 || 18 || 34.9 || .466 || .347 || .800 || 4.6 || 3.7 || .8 || .1 || 21.6
|-
| 
| 18 || 18 || style=background:#0B60AD;color:white;|39.3 || .404 || .397 || .889 || 4.6 || 1.7 || 1.2 || .1 || 10.6
|-
| 
| 10 || 0 || 3.7 || .500 || .400 || 1.000 || .3 || .4 || .1 || .0 || 3.2
|-
| 
| 8 || 0 || 3.8 || .500 || style=background:#0B60AD;color:white;|.500 || .833 || 1.1 || .0 || .0 || .0 || 1.8
|-
| ≠
| 18 || 3 || 27.8 || .417 || .417 || .821 || 2.4 || 3.6 || .8 || .3 || 14.2
|-
| 
| 15 || 15 || 36.8 || .455 || .345 || .770 || style=background:#0B60AD;color:white;|9.8 || style=background:#0B60AD;color:white;|6.4 || style=background:#0B60AD;color:white;|1.8 || .6 || style=background:#0B60AD;color:white;|31.7
|-
| 
| 18 || 18 || 38.2 || .471 || .426 || .708 || 5.5 || 1.9 || .9 || .4 || 11.7
|-
| 
| 16 || 0 || 7.6 || .286 || .227 || .250 || .8 || .4 || .3 || .0 || 1.4
|-
| 
| 18 || 0 || 25.4 || .509 || .436 || .714 || 4.6 || 1.1 || .2 || style=background:#0B60AD;color:white;|.8 || 8.7
|-
| 
| 12 || 0 || 2.0 || .250 || — || 1.000 || 1.0 || .0 || .3 || .0 || 1.3
|-
| 
| 12 || 0 || 10.4 || .333 || .300 || 1.000 || 1.0 || .8 || .7 || .1 || 1.9
|-
| 
| 18 || 18 || 13.8 || style=background:#0B60AD;color:white;|.629 || .000 || .609 || 2.6 || .2 || .2 || .3 || 3.2
|}

Transactions

Trades

Contract extensions

Free agents

Re-signed

Additions

Subtractions

Awards

References

Dallas Mavericks seasons
Dallas Mavericks
Dallas Mavericks
Dallas Mavericks